Jean Pieters is a Dutch biochemist and Professor at the Biozentrum of the University of Basel, Switzerland.

Life 
Jean Pieters studied biochemistry and microbiology at the University of Leuven in Belgium. After completing his doctorate at Maastricht University, the Netherlands, he joined the European Molecular Biology Laboratory (EMBL) in Heidelberg in 1989 as a postdoctoral fellow in Bernhard Dobberstein’s laboratory. From 1992 until 1995 Jean Pieters researched at the Netherlands Cancer Institute in Amsterdam as a junior group leader. In 1996 he was recruited to the Basel Institute for Immunology and in 2002 appointed to the Biozentrum at the University of Basel.

Work 
Jean Pieters investigates the role of coronin proteins in activating cellular signal transduction processes. Coronin proteins are widely distributed in the eukaryotic kingdom and conserved from yeast to man. One of the most conserved members of this protein family, mammalian coronin 1, was originally discovered in his laboratory as a host factor responsible for the intracellular survival of pathogenic mycobacteria.
Subsequent work from his laboratory showed that coronin proteins regulate diverse physiologic processes including T cell homeostasis, learning and memory  and development. More recently, his laboratory showed that coronin 1 signaling plays a crucial role in auto- and alloimmunity   and that coronin-mediated signaling underlies the longevity of T cells. Research in his laboratory currently focusses on the role for coronin proteins in the establishment and regulation of cell populations.

Awards and honors
2011 Elected corresponding member of the Royal Netherlands Academy of Arts and Sciences
2002 Friedrich Miescher Award
2001 Pfizer Forschungspreis
1999 Eppendorf Young Investigator Award

Notable publications

References

External links 
Official website
In the Blood. The-scientist.com.
Youtube video playlist

Living people
Old University of Leuven alumni
Maastricht University alumni
Academic staff of the University of Basel
University of Basel alumni
Biozentrum University of Basel
Members of the Royal Netherlands Academy of Arts and Sciences
Year of birth missing (living people)
Dutch expatriates in Switzerland